Alexander Perls Rousmaniere (born May 11, 1976) is an American musician, entrepreneur, and record producer. His songs are known for their mix of electronic, trance, and religiously themed lyrics and are entirely written, performed, and produced by Perls; notable projects include 009 Sound System and Aalborg Soundtracks.

Early life and education 
Though born in Gas, Kansas, he grew up in Boston, Massachusetts, culminating in an education at Concord Academy. While studying at University College London in 1997, Perls worked with the post-rock collective Piano Magic.

Following Perls' graduation from Oberlin College in 1998, he began working for the Barbara Gladstone Gallery, a leading contemporary art dealership in New York. The following year he co-founded NATOarts, which (according to its charter) sought to "promote global security and stability through the exhibition of works of conceptual art." The government support for the organization was terminated in the early days of the George W. Bush administration, ultimately leading to a decision to focus on a career as a songwriter.

Music career 
Between 2000 and 2008, Perls primarily composed music for European dance music artists, including David Guetta, Paul van Dyk, Ian Carey, ATB, and Robert M. He also provided vocals for Cosmic Gate on their album Earth Mover. first in New York City, and after 2006, in Los Angeles. From 2000 to 2003 he was one of the members of the electronic music duo CIRC, which released one album, Love Electric, and several singles and remixes.

Between 2002 and 2004, Perls' music publishing catalog was represented by Bug Music. Beginning in 2004, his catalog was represented outside the United States by the Independent Music Group, and since 2011 has been represented internationally by Kobalt Music Group.

In 2011, Track One Recordings opened a remix competition for Perls' productions "Dreamscape" and "Born to Be Wasted".

Perls' song "Wings" was commissioned to be the theme song for the "Wings Flying Hoodie," a sweatshirt with a built in inflatable travel pillow and eye mask.

YouTube 
As a consequence of YouTube introducing a system called AudioSwap on February 22, 2007, which replaces the audio of copyrighted soundtracks with a different, Creative Commons licensed song, several songs from 009 Sound System, particularly "Dreamscape," "With a Spirit," "Space and Time," "Born To Be Wasted," "Holy Ghost," and "Trinity," became widely prominent on many YouTube videos. Because the artists were alphabetically sorted, 009 Sound System songs were placed at the top of the AudioSwap list, leading them to be chosen by a majority of users.

Personal life 
Perls is married to Los Angeles jewelry designer Sonia Boyajian.

Perls is CEO of the Los Angeles software company Ezvid. Its eponymous flagship product, a freeware video maker for Windows, includes several of Perls' songs under the artist names "009 Sound System" and "Aalborg Soundtracks" as free soundtracks for users' projects.

Discography

Movies 
 Sky Fighters (2005)  (original title)
 Return2Sender (2005) - composer
 Suicide Room (2011)  (original title) - soundtrack lyricist

References

External links 
 

Living people
1976 births
American electronic musicians
American people of German descent
Concord Academy alumni
Oberlin College alumni
People from Allen County, Kansas
Musicians from Boston
Record producers from Massachusetts